Pisa Charterhouse (Calci Charterhouse) is a former Carthusian monastery, and is the home of the Pisa Museum of Natural History. It is 10 km outside Pisa, Tuscany, Italy.

The monastery is noted for the fresco of the Last Supper, by Bernardino Poccetti (1597).

Charterhouse
The Carthusians founded a monastery in 1366/67 in what is called Val Graziosa, a plain overlooked by the Monti Pisani when Francesco Moricotti Prignani was archbishop of Pisa. Shortly afterwards Pope Gregory XI, a noted reformer of monasteries, expelled the monks from the Benedictine Gorgona Abbey, on the island of Gorgona, and gave the island and the estate to the Carthusians of Val Graziosa, who repopulated them. This event must have happened not long before Catherine of Siena's visit of 1375, as she mentions in her letters the need to convert the facilities for the Carthusian use. Benedictines were barred from the island.

In 1425, the Mediterranean reached a peak of political instability. The peace and safety of the monks on Gorgona could no longer be assured. Fearing a Saracen attack they abandoned the monastery and took up residence at Calci, bringing the records from Gorgona with them, to be duly published at Pisa.

In the 17th and 18th centuries, the complex was renovated, receiving its current Baroque appearance.

After WW2 members of convents from the Netherlands started to repopulate the building that had been heavily damaged during the war years. It was thought that a Dutch Carthusian monastery in Italy could one day lead to the re-establishment of a Carthusian monastery in the Netherlands. However, a lack of funds, lack of novices and internal strife caused the Dutch to abandon their project in the 1960s.

While the most recent monks to have lived in the monastery left in 1972, the monastic living quarters have since been renovated and are also open to the public.

Museum

In 1981, the University of Pisa moved its natural history museum to the Pisa Charterhouse. The collection was started in Pisa in the 16th century as a cabinet of curiosities connected to the Giardino dei Semplici. It houses one of the largest collections of cetaceans skeletons in Europe. The museum also includes a collection of 51 glass marine invertebrates made by Bohemian glass artists Leopold and Rudolf Blaschka.

Notes

External links

1366 establishments in Europe
14th-century establishments in Italy

Monasteries in Tuscany
Carthusian monasteries in Italy
University of Pisa
University museums in Italy
Natural history museums in Italy
Museums established in 1981
Fresco paintings in Pisa
Museums in Pisa
1981 establishments in Italy